Tegula verdispira is a species of sea snail, a marine gastropod mollusk in the family Tegulidae.

Distribution
This species occurs in the Pacific Ocean off Islas Tres Marias, Mexico

References

External links
 To World Register of Marine Species

verdispira
Gastropods described in 1970